The Birmingham Public School in the South Side Flats neighborhood of Pittsburgh, Pennsylvania is a building from 1871. In 1944 it was sold to the Catholic Church and served as the middle school for St. Adalbert's Parish.  It was listed on the National Register of Historic Places in 1986.  It is currently an apartment building.

References

School buildings on the National Register of Historic Places in Pennsylvania
Italianate architecture in Pennsylvania
School buildings completed in 1871
Schools in Pittsburgh
National Register of Historic Places in Pittsburgh
1871 establishments in Pennsylvania